Daniel Phillip Keat (born 28 September 1987) is a former New Zealand footballer who played as a midfielder.

Amateur career
His hometown is Lower Hutt, where he attended Hutt International Boys' School in Upper Hutt and was named Sportsman of the Year in 2004 and 2005. He was also named the College Sport Wellington 2005 Sportsperson of the Year for his achievements in football. Keat made 28 appearances for Team Wellington in the New Zealand Football Championship before making his way to the United States to take up a football scholarship with Dartmouth College. However, the Ivy League does not offer "football scholarships" or scholarships for any sport.

Dartmouth College
At the end of high school in 2006, Keat began his undergraduate education with fellow New Zealand U-20 soon-to-be teammate Craig Henderson at Dartmouth College and has since graduated with a government major.

Keat has earned All-American status and on the back of a stellar 2009 season, was named in the All-Ivy first team and the NSCAA All-Northeast squads. This led to trials with Scottish Premier league giants Rangers F.C. and also another trial at England's Blackburn Rovers.

Professional career
In 2004, Keat was offered a month-long trial with Premier League club Blackburn Rovers, however a fractured ankle suffered playing school football two weeks before he was set to leave looked to have scuttled his chance. Blackburn opted to wait for Keat to recover and offered him a new trial opportunity in January 2005. Unfortunately, Keat's trial was unsuccessful and he returned to the NZFC for round 12 of the 2005-06 season.

Los Angeles
Keat was selected third overall in the 2011 MLS Supplemental Draft by the Los Angeles Galaxy. He has already signed a contract with Major League Soccer. After recovering for two months from the heel fracture he suffered during pre-season training Keat made his senior debut in a friendly versus Real Madrid.

Keat's 2013 option was not taken by Los Angeles at the end of the 2012 MLS season.

Falkenbergs FF

After leaving Los Angeles, Keat signed with Falkenbergs FF in the Swedish Superettan. Keat was part of the Falkenbergs FF side that won the 2013 Superettan. Keat made 20 appearances and scored 4 goals.

GAIS

Early 2016, Dan signed with GAIS.

International career
Keat captained the under 20's while scoring 4 times in 6 games in qualifying for their first appearance at the FIFA U-20 World Cup, in Canada 2007.

In their World Cup build up, Keat scored a goal in a friendly match against Wellington A-League franchise Wellington Phoenix in a 2-1 upset win.

He was also a part of the Under 23's in their qualifying campaign to the 2008 Beijing Olympic Games, however after playing all 5 qualifying games he suffered a devastating knee injury while playing for his University side Dartmouth College in the US and was missed the entire tournament.

Keat made his debut with the full national team on 29 February 2012 against Jamaica. He came on in the 64th minute for Michael McGlinchey.

International goals and caps
New Zealand's goal tally first.

International career statistics

Honors

Los Angeles Galaxy
 MLS Cup (2): 2011, 2012
 Major League Soccer Supporters' Shield (1): 2011
 Major League Soccer Western Conference Championship (2): 2011, 2012

Falkenbergs FF
 Superettan: 2013 Superettan

References

External links
 
 
 NZ Football Profile

1987 births
Living people
Allsvenskan players
Association football midfielders
Dartmouth Big Green men's soccer players
Expatriate soccer players in the United States
Falkenbergs FF players
GAIS players
LA Galaxy draft picks
LA Galaxy players
Major League Soccer players
New Zealand association footballers
New Zealand expatriate association footballers
New Zealand expatriate sportspeople in the United States
New Zealand international footballers
Sportspeople from Barnstaple
Sportspeople from Lower Hutt
Superettan players
Team Wellington players